Brachmia xeronoma is a moth in the family Gelechiidae. It was described by Edward Meyrick in 1935. It is found on Java in Indonesia.

References

Moths described in 1935
Brachmia
Taxa named by Edward Meyrick
Moths of Indonesia